Akhtar Karnana Railway Station  is located in Karnana, Gujrat district of Punjab province, Pakistan.

See also
 List of railway stations in Pakistan
 Pakistan Railways

References

External links

Railway stations in Gujrat District
Railway stations on Shorkot–Lalamusa Branch Line